Michael Francis Lucy (6 November 1915 – 9 January 1971), Australian politician, was a Member of the Victorian Legislative Assembly for the Electoral district of Ivanhoe representing the Labor Party from 1952–1955 and the Australian Labor Party (Anti-Communist) (Democratic Labor Party) from March–April 1955.

References

1915 births
1971 deaths
Australian Labor Party members of the Parliament of Victoria
Democratic Labor Party (historical) members of the Parliament of Victoria
Victoria (Australia) state politicians
20th-century Australian politicians